Bingaman is a surname, an altered spelling of the German surname Bingemann. Notable people with the surname include:

 Adam Lewis Bingaman (1790–1869), Mississippi state representative and president of the Mississippi State Senate
 Jeff Bingaman (born 1943), senior U.S. Senator from the state of New Mexico
 Les Bingaman (1926–1970), NFL Pro Bowl defensive end and coach

See also
 Bingaman Lake, a lake in California

References

Surnames of German origin